Richard E. Hammel, a Democratic Party politician, was a member of the Michigan House of Representatives from the 48th District.

Life
Hamel obtained a bachelor's degree from the University of Michigan-Flint.

Political career
Hammel served on the Genesee County, Michigan Board of Commissioners and served as its chair before being elected to the Michigan State House of Representatives in 2006.  Hammel defeated Ralph C. Burger for the 48th District Michigan State Representative seat in 2008 then repeated in 2010 by defeating Susan Culver in 2010.  Democratic Representatives selected him as minority leader for the legislative session beating out fellow Genesee County representative Woodrow Stanley.

Michigan House of Representative Elections

References 

Living people
Democratic Party members of the Michigan House of Representatives
People from Genesee County, Michigan
1958 births
University of Michigan–Flint alumni
21st-century American politicians